Tony Träskelin is a Finnish male curler.

Teams

References

External links

Living people

Finnish male curlers

Date of birth missing (living people)
Place of birth missing (living people)
Year of birth missing (living people)
21st-century Finnish people